Bruce Lee's Secret  is a    Hong Kong martial arts action film directed  by Chan Wa and William Cheung Ki. which is also a pseudo biopic of Bruce Lee. It stars Bruce Li as "Bob" Lee, whose life is essentially the same as Lee's and is on two occasions actually referred to as 'Bruce'.  The film has been released under the alternate two film titles: they were: The Story of the Dragon and Bruce Lee: Master of Jeet Kune Do. This film is not to be confused with another Bruce Lee biopic, Bruce Lee: A Dragon Story.

Synopsis
In San Francisco, Bruce "Bob" Lee (Bruce Li) works in a Chinese food restaurant with his wacky friend Chang Ming.  When a gang of hoodlums is making trouble, Bob puts a lot of pepper on their chicken, making them sneeze a lot (and inspiring the immortal line, "This is pepper chicken.  Good for gut's ache!").

Unfortunately, Bob and Chang are blacklisted from the bustling San Francisco Chinese restaurant community by the gang.  They accidentally land a job at a shipyard after narrowly averting being run over by the owner's daughter's car.  She tells them to get back to work, assuming they already work there unloading speaker cabinet boxes.  The shipyard is attacked by members of the boxing gang that Bob beat up in the beginning of the film.  At first, Bob and Chang refuse to fight to prevent losing their jobs again.  However, they are called chickens by the shipyard owners, and after finally beating up some bad guys, people realize what an amazing martial artist Bob is, and encourage him to start his own kung fu school.

Bob's school opens to boffo business, but there is controversy among the powerful rival kung fu schools because Bob is teaching to non-Asians.  He also creates Jeet Kune Do, and uses his newly improves martial arts ability to whup the baddies once and for all.

Production
Filming started in late 1975 and finished early 1976. The film was made in Taipei and nearby areas. The restaurant scene at the start is in Bo-Ai street, Taipei. The bungalows are in a former US military housing complex near Taipei. The docks scenes are at Keelung. Some scenes were shot in the suburb of Beitou.

Reaction
The film was poorly received by critics. Despite the negative reaction to this film, actor Hwang Jang Lee would later achieve stardom after appearing as the bad guy in Jackie Chan's breakout films, Snake in the Eagle's Shadow and Drunken Master.

See also
 List of Hong Kong films

External links

1976 films
1976 martial arts films
1970s action films
Hong Kong action films
Bruceploitation films
Kung fu films
Hong Kong martial arts films
1980s Hong Kong films
1970s Hong Kong films